Daeguia caeni is a Gram-negative, non-spore-forming bacterium from the genus Daeguia, which was isolated from sludge of a textile dye works in Daegu in Korea.

References

External links
Type strain of Daeguia caeni at BacDive -  the Bacterial Diversity Metadatabase

Hyphomicrobiales
Bacteria described in 2008